Ethmia penyagolosella is a moth in the family Depressariidae. It is found in Spain.

References

Moths described in 2003
penyagolosella